The following Union Army units and commanders fought in the Battle of Olustee of the American Civil War. The Confederate order of battle is listed separately.

Rank abbreviations

 BG = Brigadier general
 Col = Colonel
 Ltc = Lieutenant colonel
 Maj = Major
 Cpt = Captain
 Lt = Lieutenant

District of Florida
BG Truman Seymour

References

External links
 Battle of Olustee Web site with history of units and soldiers

American Civil War orders of battle